Halcyon is the second studio album by English singer and songwriter Ellie Goulding, released on 5 October 2012 by Polydor Records. The album was recorded between 2011 and 2012, during promotion for her debut album, Lights (2010). Goulding worked with several producers on the album, including Jim Eliot, Starsmith, Billboard, Justin Parker, Monsta, Madeon and Mike Spencer, in addition to collaborating with artists such as Tinie Tempah and Calvin Harris.

Halcyon received generally positive reviews from music critics, who complimented Goulding's more aggressive showcase of her voice and the album's bold production. The album debuted at number two on the UK Albums Chart, selling 33,425 copies in its first week. In January 2014, it topped the UK Albums Chart and gave Goulding her second number-one album. Halcyon also debuted at number nine on the Billboard 200 in the United States, while reaching number one in Ireland, the top five in New Zealand, and the top 10 in Canada, Germany and Switzerland.

"Anything Could Happen" was released as the lead single from Halcyon on 17 August 2012, peaking at number five on the UK Singles Chart. "Figure 8" was released as the album's second single, peaking at number 33 on the UK Singles Chart and number seven on the New Zealand Singles Chart. The album's third single, "Explosions", peaked at number 13 on the UK chart. To further promote the album, Goulding embarked on a nine-day promotional tour across the United Kingdom. The Halcyon Days Tour was unveiled along with North American dates, beginning in Miami Beach, Florida. The album was reissued twice: Halcyon Days was released on 23 August 2013, and Halcyon Nights was released on 12 October 2022, in honor of Halcyons tenth anniversary.

Background 
After signing a recording deal with Polydor Records in July 2009, Goulding's debut studio album, Lights, was released in February 2010 to generally positive reviews from music critics. The album debuted at number one on the UK Albums Chart, and has since sold 807,000 copies in the United Kingdom and 1.6 million copies worldwide. In February 2011, Goulding told the Daily Star that she had plans to release a follow-up to Lights sometime in 2011, commenting, "I'm not going to go away for ages. It'll be out this year or the start of next." In April 2012, Goulding stated that she hoped the album would be released in October 2012.

The majority of the tracks on Halcyon were recorded with producer Jim Eliot of Kish Mauve in a converted barn near Lyonshall, Herefordshire, the village where Goulding grew up. Recording sessions for the album also took place in Wales, London, Montreal and Brighton. In an interview with Carson Daly on his 97.1 AMP Radio show on 6 August 2012, Goulding explained the inspiration behind the album's title, saying, "[Halcyon is] like a bird that basically during the winter, it would lay its eggs by the sea and bring calm to the stormy waters and a lot of my songs on this record are about the ocean and water." She also unveiled two songs from the album—"Only You" and the title track "Halcyon".

In retrospect, Goulding described the album in 2015 as "very self-indulgent. It was all me, every single lyric on the album."

Composition 
In March 2011, when asked about the album's musical direction in an interview with gossip website Dean Piper's World, Goulding stated, "It's started to sound very dark and very weird. This album is going to be even more emotional [...] I wanted to make it so there is hope. I want to make an effect whether it's happy or sad." Goulding added, "This album for me is a journey from dark into light from confusion to understanding [...] I didn't set out to write a break-up record but I think it became one." In an interview with MTV News on 29 August 2012, Goulding elaborated on the sound of the album, saying, "I've moved on quite a bit since the first album, because I've discovered so much; I've learned a lot more and I've grown up a lot more. I've gained more influences and different influences and people have influenced it; I suppose just circumstances. It's a bit more tribal and anthemic; a bit more piano and vocal than anything. The last album was very electronic, but it was tied in with my voice; this one, to me, is way more of a pop record."

The album's opening track, "Don't Say a Word", was described as "gorgeously electronic" while "morphing through synthscapes". "My Blood" was written and produced by Goulding and Eliot and was described as echoing the vocals of Adele. "Anything Could Happen" is an electro ballad written and produced by Goulding and Eliot, containing "spurting synths and a sky-kissing chorus". The fourth track "Only You" was referred to as "somewhere in between, thunderous and electrifying but bereft of the kind of earworms that would make it compulsively replayable". The title track "Halcyon" was co-written and co-produced by Goulding and is an electronic song. The seventh track "Joy" was co-written by Goulding and was described as a "string-laden affair that showcases her helium-powered pipes". The next song is a "disco-goth" rendition of American artist Active Child's 2011 song "Hanging On". "Explosions" starts with a choir and ambient drums; after the chorus, the piano drops and the production surges to a roar. The 10th song on the album, "I Know You Care", was co-written by Goulding and Justin Parker. Lyrically the song speaks of "her trying to convince someone—us, her lover, herself—that they have something worth salvaging". "Atlantis" is lyrically "a quintessential break-up song, balancing moving on, with the helplessness of love and love lost". "Dead in the Water" is the final song on the album, besides the bonus track "I Need Your Love", a collaboration with Scottish musician Calvin Harris.

Release and promotion 

Goulding previewed the album with the release of a cover version of the Active Child song "Hanging On", which features Tinie Tempah, as a free download on her SoundCloud page on 10 July 2012. On 3 August 2012, Goulding released a trailer on YouTube containing snippets of tracks from the album, including "Anything Could Happen". Goulding appeared on Fearne Cotton's BBC Radio 1 show on 9 August for the premiere of "Anything Could Happen". A video for the song "I Know You Care" was released online on 24 September 2012, containing footage from the 2012 romantic drama film Now Is Good, which features the song. The song was released digitally on 20 September 2013 in support of Save the Children's #song4syria campaign, serving as the soundtrack to a film dedicated to the children of Syria by director Beeban Kidron. A 90-second music video for "Only You" was exclusively filmed for online fashion retailer ASOS as part of their #BestNightEver holiday campaign, and was officially released on 5 November 2012.

In conjunction with British music retailer HMV, fans had the chance to vote for Goulding to perform live and sign copies of Halcyon at their local store on the day of the album's UK release on 8 October 2012; it was announced on 20 September that the event would take place at Manchester's Market Street store. Goulding played two London shows prior to the release of Halcyon—the first on 26 September as part of the iTunes Festival at the Roundhouse, which was streamed live via an iTunes application, and the second on 5 October as part of the Q Awards 2012 gigs series at Camden Town's Jazz Café. Goulding also played three intimate shows in North America during the release week of Halcyon—at New York City's Santos Party House on 11 October 2012, at Toronto's Sound Academy on 14 October and at Los Angeles' The Troubadour on 16 October.

Goulding performed "Anything Could Happen" on Late Night with Jimmy Fallon on 10 October 2012, on Today on 11 October, on The Ellen DeGeneres Show and Conan on 17 October, on Top of the Pops on 31 December, on Good Morning America on 22 January 2013, and on Jimmy Kimmel Live! on 12 February. She performed "My Blood" on Later... with Jools Holland on 16 November 2012. On 30 December, Goulding appeared on the British chat show Sunday Brunch to perform "Figure 8". She performed "Explosions" on the British television programme This Morning on 22 February 2013. On 14 December 2013, Goulding performed "Anything Could Happen" on The X Factor UK final with finalist Luke Friend.

"Hanging On" was used in the CW shows Gossip Girl and Nikita in addition to the film Divergent and soundtrack to The Host. The song's Living Phantoms remix was featured in a trailer for the 2013 PlayStation 3 video game God of War: Ascension. "Dead in the Water" was featured on the 15th episode of the ninth season of the ABC medical drama Grey's Anatomy on 14 February 2013. The track "Stay Awake", produced by French producer Madeon, was released exclusively on Beatport on 24 March 2013. On 15 April 2013, an exclusive album containing remixes of tracks from Halcyon was released by Nike for free streaming and download to coincide with the Nike Women Half Marathon that Goulding would be partaking in, which took place in Washington, D.C. on 28 April 2013. "My Blood" was included in the deluxe edition of the Divergent soundtrack in addition to appearing in the trailer for Disney's live-action version of Cinderella.

Singles 
In late July 2012, Goulding announced on Facebook that the album's lead single would be "Anything Could Happen", asking fans to contribute to a lyric video for the single by submitting photos related to the song's lyrics via Instagram. The lyric video premiered on YouTube on 9 August 2012, and was followed by the release of the single via all digital retailers on 17 August. "Anything Could Happen" reached number five on the UK Singles Chart, becoming Goulding's third top-five entry in the UK. The single charted moderately worldwide, reaching the top 20 in Australia, Ireland and New Zealand, and the top 40 in Belgium and Canada.

"Figure 8" was released as the album's second single on 13 December 2012, peaking at number 33 on the UK Singles Chart. The song was more commercially successful in New Zealand and Finland, where it reached numbers seven and eight, respectively.

"Explosions" was released on iTunes in Ireland on 3 August 2012 and in the UK on 1 October 2012, but was removed shortly thereafter on both occasions. In late January 2013, it was announced that the song would be released as the album's third single. "Explosions" reached number 13 on the UK chart and number 100 on the US Billboard Hot 100.

Tour 
On 7 December 2012, Goulding embarked on a nine-date promotional tour across the United Kingdom, which kicked off in Bristol and ended in Southampton on 18 December. The tour's official name, The Halcyon Days Tour, was unveiled on 22 October 2012 along with North American dates, beginning in Miami Beach, Florida, on 16 January 2013. Additional European dates followed on 15 November 2012. Opening acts include Yasmin and Sons & Lovers for the UK, St. Lucia for North America, and Charli XCX for Europe. On 20 February 2013, Goulding was announced as the support act on select North American dates of Bruno Mars's The Moonshine Jungle Tour from July to August 2013.

An additional 10 UK dates were announced in June 2013, starting at O2 Academy Sheffield on 3 October 2013 and ending at O2 Apollo Manchester on 18 October. Following Goulding's sold-out October tour, it was announced on 27 August 2013 that she would headline her first UK arena tour in early March 2014, with shows at Capital FM Arena Nottingham, Echo Arena Liverpool and London's O2 Arena. She also toured Europe in promotion of Halcyon Days in January and February 2014, visiting countries such as Germany, Sweden, Denmark, Norway, Poland, France and the Netherlands. On 18 November 2013, a North American tour was announced for spring, which kicked off at Madison Square Garden in New York City on 12 March 2014 and ended at the Kool Haus in Toronto on 9 May. The Oceanian leg of the tour ran from 28 May to 11 June 2014, visiting five cities in Australia and three in New Zealand.

Critical reception 

Halcyon received generally positive reviews from music critics. At Metacritic, which assigns a normalised rating out of 100 to reviews from mainstream publications, the album received an average score of 69, based on 17 reviews. The Daily Telegraphs Neil McComick wrote that Goulding's voice is "really something special", concluding, "[A]s luxuriously epic as Enya yet with the kind of dynamism of Florence + the Machine, Goulding's poetically opaque lyrics gain real dramatic weight. On a big, bold album, Goulding gives the expression 'singing like a bird' a whole new dimension." Melissa Maerz of Entertainment Weekly commented that the album has "harp solos, digitally tweaked cyborg harmonies, and at least one tribute to bodily fluids ('My Blood'). But they're anchored by giant, disco-ball hooks and the type of dance beats you might find on a NOW That's What I Call Music! comp." Mikael Wood of the Los Angeles Times remarked that on Halcyon, Goulding "marries thoughtful ruminations on young love to whooshing synth riffs and hard-edged machine beats; the album claims electronic dance music as the natural province of sensitive singer-songwriters." Michael Cragg of The Fly referred to the album as "a bold and confident step forward".

AllMusic editor Matt Collar stated that Goulding "dresses up her powerful lark of a voice with a delicately laced veil of digital effects." He continued, "An ambitious work by an artist intent on developing her total sound, Halcyon finds Goulding poised at the edge of artistic and career possibilities." In a review for Rolling Stone, Will Hermes expressed, "If the songwriting doesn't quite measure up to U.K. art-pop divas like Kate Bush, the hooks always go to town, and her voice—Dolly Parton-dazzling in the upper register—mates gorgeously with electronics". Geoff Nelson of PopMatters concluded, "On Halcyon Goulding amplifies her music genealogy, both who she is and who she's been, in what is an often successful attempt to transition to iconic stardom [...] The outcome is a bit flawed and a very loud version of her biggest and smallest self." USA Todays Jerry Shriver viewed that on Halcyon, Goulding "presents an edgier, more aggressive showcase for her swooping, stratosphere-piercing vibrato", while noting that "[h]er tone, balanced between girlish and womanly, is appealing, as is her clear intent to be an Artist. One wishes, however, she'd frolic in the heather now and then for contrast." Despite calling the album a "well-crafted, stylish piece of work", Andy Gill of The Independent felt that "it's hard to love songs that try to hide." The Guardians Rebecca Nicholson opined that the album "isn't nearly as wet as its predecessor", but added that "the main flaw of Halcyon is that it occasionally feels a bit too much—and that's something Goulding, perennially painted as the timid type, may not be so sad about." Hayley Avron of NME critiqued, "Mainly, Halcyon sees Goulding's quirky-as-usual vocals lazily spliced into factory-standard chart dance. On 'Joy' and 'I Know You Care' her artistry is briefly allowed to breathe, away from the desperate bombast of the suffocating backing tracks."

Commercial performance 
Halcyon debuted at number two on the UK Albums Chart and at number one on the UK Album Downloads Chart, selling 33,425 copies in its first week–10.3% less than the opening figure for Lights. The following week, it fell to number seven on sales of 11,082 copies. Following the Halcyon Days re-release in August 2013, the album jumped from number 26 to number three on sales of 15,883 units, achieving its then-highest chart placing since its debut. On 5 January 2014, in its 65th week on the chart, Halcyon climbed from number six to number one on the UK Albums Chart with 37,507 copies sold, becoming Goulding's second number-one album in the UK. It spent a second consecutive week at number one, selling 26,456 copies. The following week, the album sold 24,831 copies and fell to number two, before returning to the top spot for a third non-consecutive with sales of 20,928 copies. By July 2017, the album had sold 1.18 million copies in the UK.

The album debuted at number eight on the Irish Albums Chart. The Halcyon Days reissue propelled the album to number seven on the Irish chart for the week ending 29 August 2013, before rising yet again to number four on 19 December. The album eventually topped the Irish Albums Chart for the week ending 2 January 2014, more than a year after its original release and over four months after the re-release. The album debuted at number nine on the Billboard 200 in the United States, with 34,000 copies sold in its opening week. As of September 2015, the album had sold 522,000 copies in the United States. In Oceania, it debuted and peaked at number 16 in Australia and at number three in New Zealand. Elsewhere, Halcyon reached the top 10 in Canada, Germany, Greece and Switzerland, and the top 15 in Belgium and Norway.

Track listing

Deluxe edition

Notes 
  signifies an additional producer
  signifies a remixer
  signifies a vocal producer

Personnel 
Credits adapted from the liner notes of the UK deluxe edition of Halcyon.

Musicians 

 Ellie Goulding – vocals ; acoustic guitar ; bass ; electric guitar 
 Jim Eliot – drums, synths, piano, percussion, drum programming ; backing vocals 
 London Community Gospel Choir – choir 
 Sally Herbert – choir arrangement, choir conducting ; string arrangement, string conducting 
 Rufio Sandilands – all instruments ; keyboards, programming, backing vocals, drums, music 
 Rocky Morris – all instruments ; keyboards, drums, programming, music 
 Mike Spencer – all instruments 
 John Fortis – keyboards, programming 
 Kirsty Mangan – violin 
 Ashley Krajewski – additional programming 
 Justin Parker – piano, programming, backing vocals 
 Fin Dow-Smith – piano, synths, string arrangement ; bass, electric guitar, all percussion, Rhodes, backing vocals, all keyboards 
 Hannah Dawson – violin 
 Natalie Holt – viola 
 Rachael Lander – cello 
 Calvin Harris – all instruments 
 Ash Howes – additional keyboards, additional programming 
 Philippe Look – guitar 
 Joe Clegg – drums 
 Tinie Tempah – rap vocals 
 Richard George – violin leader 
 Rick Koster – violin 
 Natalia Bonner – violin 
 Gareth Griffiths – violin 
 Kate Robinson – violin 
 Matty Ward – violin 
 Gillon Cameron – violin 
 Emma Parker – violin 
 Nina Foster – violin 
 Olli Langford – violin 
 John Metcalfe – viola 
 Fiona Bonds – viola 
 Max Baillie – viola 
 Ian Burdge – cello 
 Sophie Harris – cello 
 Jonny Byers – cello

Technical 

 Jim Eliot – production, sound effects 
 Ellie Goulding – production 
 Tom Elmhirst – mixing 
 Ben Baptie – mixing assistance ; additional engineering 
 Graham Archer – choir recording engineering ; string engineering 
 Joel M. Peters – choir recording engineering assistance ; string engineering assistance 
 Monsta – production, recording ; additional vocal production 
 Mike Spencer – additional production, mixing, additional vocal production, recording 
 Jonny Lattimer – vocal production 
 Billboard – production 
 Richard Vincent – engineering 
 Philippe Dumais – engineering assistance 
 John Fortis – production 
 Ashley Krajewski – recording 
 George Murphy – recording 
 Justin Parker – production, mixing 
 Starsmith – production 
 Adam Miller – string engineering 
 John Prestage – string engineering assistance 
 Calvin Harris – production, mixing 
 Biff Stannard – vocal production 
 Ash Howes – vocal production, mixing 
 Marc Bell – engineering 
 Lee Slater – drum engineering 
 Naweed – mastering 
 Karen Thompson – mastering

Artwork 
 Simon Procter – photography
 Ellie Goulding – art direction
 Cassandra Gracey – art direction
 Richard Andrews – design

Charts

Weekly charts

Year-end charts

Decade-end charts

Certifications

Release history

Notes

References 

2012 albums
Albums produced by Calvin Harris
Albums produced by Fraser T. Smith
Albums produced by Jim Eliot
Cherrytree Records albums
Ellie Goulding albums
Interscope Geffen A&M Records albums
Interscope Records albums
Polydor Records albums